The Romp is a 1767 play, a comedic afterpiece, which was derived from Love in the City by Isaac Bickerstaffe.

The piece centred on the most popular character of the original play, Priscilla Tomboy, also known as "Miss Prissy".

Original cast

Drury Lane
Young Cockney by James William Dodd (Mr. Dodd)
Barnacle by Mr. Suett
Old Cockney by Mr. Fawcett
Captain Sightly by William Barrymore (Mr. Barrymore)
Priscilla Tomboy by Dorothy Jordan (Mrs. Jordan)
Penelope by Miss Stageldoir
Miss La Blond by Miss Barnes

Haymarket (1787)
Young Cockney by Mr. Meadows
Barnacle by Mr. Booth
Old Cockney by Mr. Barrett
Captain Sightly by Mr. Wright
Priscilla Tomboy by Miss George
Penelope by Miss Burnet
Miss La Blond by Miss Brangin

References

External links
 The Romp (printed 1788) (via Google Books)
 1786 print of scene from play

1767 plays
1767 in England
Comedy plays
English plays
Plays set in London